Gordon "Gord" Buynak (born March 19, 1954 in Detroit, Michigan) is a retired American ice hockey defenseman. He played for the St. Louis Blues of the National Hockey League (NHL). As a youth, he played in the 1966 Quebec International Pee-Wee Hockey Tournament with the Detroit Roostertail minor ice hockey team.

Career statistics

References

External links
 

1954 births
Living people
American men's ice hockey defensemen
Dallas Black Hawks players
Ice hockey people from Detroit
Kansas City Blues players
Kingston Canadians players
Phoenix Roadrunners draft picks
Providence Reds players
Salt Lake Golden Eagles (CHL) players
St. Louis Blues draft picks
St. Louis Blues players
Tulsa Oilers (1964–1984) players